Robert Stefaniuk is a Canadian comedian, actor and writer who has worked in numerous television shows and films as both guest actor and series regular. His feature-film acting credits include the Saturday Night Live-inspired Superstar (1999) and Phil the Alien (2004).

Biography
Stefaniuk first appeared during the ill-fated second season of Catwalk replacing Johnny Camden as guitarist. He also appeared in the 1995 short film Love Child which also starred fellow former Catwalk star Neve Campbell. Stefaniuk's first screenplay, The Size of Watermelons, was produced as an independent feature in 1996. In 2003, he was story editor and line producer, and did additional editing, for the independent feature Public Domain, directed by Kris Lefcoe. Shortly thereafter he made his directorial debut with the short comedy film Waiting for the Man, which was an official selection at the Sundance Film Festival in 2005. He subsequently wrote and directed his first feature-length film, Phil the Alien.

From 2004 to 2006 he voiced the character of "Buzz" Sawchuck in Gene Simmons' animated television show My Dad the Rock Star on NickToons.

Stefaniuk's latest work is the movie Suck, a vampire rock and roll comedy released in 2009 at the Toronto International Film Festival and on DVD in 2010. Stefaniuk writes, directs and stars in the film alongside Dimitri Coats, Jessica Paré, Malcolm McDowell, Iggy Pop, Alice Cooper, Moby, Dave Foley and Henry Rollins.

Voices
Timothy Goes to School - Frank #2
Moville Mysteries - Luthor's bodyguard
My Dad the Rock Star - "Buzz" Sawchuck
Totally Spies! - Diminutive Smalls (Season 4)
Grossology - Andy
Spliced - Peri

Awards
2005 Don Haig Award

References

External links

Rob Stefaniuk on Northern Stars

Living people
Canadian male comedians
Canadian male film actors
Film directors from Ontario
Canadian male screenwriters
Canadian male voice actors
Canadian people of Ukrainian descent
Male actors from Ontario
Year of birth missing (living people)
21st-century Canadian screenwriters
21st-century Canadian male writers